Geophis talamancae is a snake of the colubrid family. It is found in Costa Rica and Panama.

References

Geophis
Snakes of North America
Reptiles of Costa Rica
Reptiles of Panama
Reptiles described in 1994